Kocēni Municipality is a former municipality in Vidzeme, Latvia. The municipality was formed in 2009 by merging Bērzaine Parish, Dikļi Parish, Kocēni Parish, Vaidava Parish and Zilākalns Parish; the administrative centre being Kocēni. Until 28 January 2010 the name of municipality was Valmiera Municipality (Valmieras novads).

On 1 July 2021, Kocēni Municipality ceased to exist and its territory was merged into Valmiera Municipality.

See also 
 Administrative divisions of Latvia (2009)

References 

 
Former municipalities of Latvia